Frank Collier (26 April 1933 – 1 September 1989) was an English professional rugby league footballer who played in the 1950s and 1960s.

Background
Frank Collier was born in Wigan, Lancashire, England, and he died aged 56.

Playing career

International honours
Frank Collier won caps for Great Britain while at Wigan in 1963 against Australia, and while at Widnes in 1964 against France.

Championship final appearances
Frank Collier played right-, i.e. number 10, in Wigan's 27–3 victory over Wakefield Trinity in the Championship Final during the 1959–60 season at Odsal Stadium, Bradford on Saturday 21 May 1960.

County League appearances
Frank Collier played in Wigan's victories in the Lancashire County League during the 1958–59 season and 1961–62 season.

Challenge Cup Final appearances
Frank Collier played right-, i.e. number 12, in Wigan's 13–9 victory over Workington Town in the 1957–58 Challenge Cup Final during the 1957–58 season at Wembley Stadium, London on Saturday 10 May 1958, in front of a crowd of 66,109, played in the 10–25 defeat by Wakefield Trinity in the 1962–63 Challenge Cup Final during the 1962–63 season at Wembley Stadium, London on Saturday 11 May 1963, in front of a crowd of 84,492, and played right-, i.e. number 10, and was man of the match winning the Lance Todd Trophy, in Widnes' 13–5 victory over Hull Kingston Rovers in the 1963–64 Challenge Cup Final during the 1963–64 season at Wembley Stadium, London on Saturday 9 May 1964, in front of a crowd of 84,488.

County Cup Final appearances
Frank Collier played  in Wigan's 8–16 defeat by St. Helens in the 1953 Lancashire Cup final during the 1953–54 season at Station Road, Swinton on Saturday 24 October 1953.

Genealogical information

Frank Collier's marriage to Eileen (née Walford) (birth registered second ¼ 1934) was registered during first ¼ 1953 in Wigan district. They had children; Stephen F. Collier (birth registered fourth ¼ 1953 in Ince district – death registered first ¼ 1955 (aged 1) in Wigan district), Trevor S. Collier (birth registered fourth ¼  in Wigan district, Andrew Collier (birth registered first ¼  in Ince district, and Alison Marie Collier (born July 1963).

References

External links
!Great Britain Statistics at englandrl.co.uk (statistics currently missing due to not having appeared for both Great Britain, and England)
Statistics at wigan.rlfans.com
Statistics at rugby.widnes.tv
Search for "Frank Collier" at britishnewspaperarchive.co.uk

1933 births
1989 deaths
English rugby league players
Great Britain national rugby league team players
Lance Todd Trophy winners
Place of death missing
Rugby league fullbacks
Rugby league players from Wigan
Rugby league props
Rugby league second-rows
Salford Red Devils players
Widnes Vikings players
Wigan Warriors players